Qeshlaq-e Gazlu may refer to:
 Qeshlaq-e Gazlu Hajji Mohammad
 Qeshlaq-e Gazlu Hajji Yunes